Gaudenzio is an italian given name.

Gaudenzio may also refer to:
 San Gaudenzio di Brescia, bishop of Brescia, Lombardy, Italy  and theologian.
 San Gaudenzio di Rimini, first bishop of Rimini, Emilia-Romagna, Italy, honored as a martyr by the Catholic Church.
 Basilica of San Gaudenzio, a church in Novara, Province of Novara, Piedmont, Italy.
 San Gaudenzio, a church in Ivrea, Province of Turin, Piedmont, Italy.